Lake Valdayskoye, or Lake Valdai is a freshwater lake located in the center of Valdaysky District of Novgorod Oblast in Russia in the middle of the Valdai Hills. The lake freezes up in early December and stays icebound until early May. The lake is located in the center of Valdaysky National Park.

The town of Valday stands on the southwestern shore of the lake along the M10 Moscow - St. Petersburg highway. One of the islands, Selvitsky Island, is occupied by the Valday Iversky Monastery. Besides Valday, there are also several villages around the lake. An anabranch connects Lake Valdai to a smaller lake, Lake Uzhin. Lake Uzhin, the source of the Valdayka River, belongs to the river basin of the Msta River and thus to the Baltic Sea basin.

The lake has almost a round shape with a large bay appended to it in the northwest. There are several islands on the lake, the biggest of which is the  Ryabinovy Island. It is connected to the lake coast in the south and to Iversky Monastery in the north.

Lake Valdayskoye is located in the center of the Valdai Hills, and is surrounded by many other lakes. Many of these lakes drain into Lake Valdayskoye or into the Valdayka. The basin of the lake comprises all of the northeastern part of Valdaysky District.

The lake has become a popular tourist-destination, with many recreation facilities on its shores. The first meeting of the Valdai Discussion Club took place on the lake in 2004.

The lake is navigable, and the Zarya-211 cruiser ship sailed between the town of Valday and the Iversky Monastery until 2016.

Since 2004, a road connects between Valday along the shore of Lake Valdai over a  bridge to Ryabinovy Island and then over a  bridge to the  Selvitsky Island to the monastery over which buses, taxis, and cars travel, or, during the winter when the lake is frozen, it is only a  walk between Valday and the monastery over the frozen Lake Valdayskoye.

Putin's Dacha
Putin's Dacha is on the southern  of a peninsula between Lake Uzhin and Lake Valdai and is across Lake Valdai from Valday. Often, this location, which was built in 1980, is called Valdai, Dolgie Borody, Uzhin or Stalin's Dacha, but Stalin was not alive when Valdai was built. Abuting north of this location is  owned by the Russian Federation and is frequented by the Federal Security Service. According to Alexei Navalny, Yuri Kovalchuk is the owner of Putin's Dacha.

Notes

References

External links

Valday.com
Valday.com overview of Lake Valdai

Valdayskoye
Tourist attractions in Novgorod Oblast
Drainage basins of the Baltic Sea